Conus eburneus, common name the ivory cone, is a species of sea snail, a marine gastropod mollusk in the family Conidae, the cone snails and their allies.

Like all species within the genus Conus, these snails are predatory and venomous. They are capable of "stinging" humans, therefore live ones should be handled carefully or not at all.

There is one subspecies: Conus eburneus crassus G. B. Sowerby II, 1858 represented as Conus eburneus.

Description
The size of an adult shell varies between 30 mm and 79 mm. The shell is white, usually with two or three light yellowish bands, marked with very dark brown revolving spots.

Distribution
This marine species is found in the tropical Indo-West Pacific from the coast of East Africa (off Madagascar and Chagos) to Australia (the Northern Territory, Queensland and Western Australia), Polynesia and the Ryukyu Islands (but not along Hawaii)

References

 Bruguière, M. 1792. Encyclopédie Méthodique ou par ordre de matières. Histoire naturelle des vers. Paris : Panckoucke Vol. 1 i–xviii, 757 pp.
 Röding, P.F. 1798. Museum Boltenianum sive Catalogus cimeliorum e tribus regnis naturae quae olim collegerat Joa. Hamburg : Trappii 199 pp.
 Link, H.F. 1807. Beschreibung der Naturalien Sammlung der Universität zu Rostock. Rostock : Alders Erben.
 Sowerby, G.B. 1857–1858. Monograph of the genus Conus. 1–56, pls 1–24 in Thesaurus conchyliorum or monographs of genera of shells. London : Sowerby Vol. 3.
 Weinkauff, H.C. 1874. Catalog der bis bekannt gewordenen Arten der Gattung Conus L. Jahrbücher der Deutschen Malakozoologischen Gesellschaft 1: 236–268, 273–305
 Demond, J. 1957. Micronesian reef associated gastropods. Pacific Science 11(3): 275–341, fig. 2, pl. 1
 Gillett, K. & McNeill, F. 1959. The Great Barrier Reef and Adjacent Isles: a comprehensive survey for visitor, naturalist and photographer. Sydney : Coral Press 209 pp.
 Rippingale, O.H. & McMichael, D.F. 1961. Queensland and Great Barrier Reef Shells. Brisbane : Jacaranda Press 210 pp.
 Maes, V.O. 1967. The littoral marine mollusks of Cocos-Keeling Islands (Indian Ocean). Proceedings of the Academy of Natural Sciences, Philadelphia 119: 93–217 
 Wilson, B.R. & Gillett, K. 1971. Australian Shells: illustrating and describing 600 species of marine gastropods found in Australian waters. Sydney : Reed Books 168 pp.
 Hinton, A. 1972. Shells of New Guinea and the Central Indo-Pacific. Milton : Jacaranda Press xviii 94 pp.
 Salvat, B. & Rives, C. 1975. Coquillages de Polynésie. Tahiti : Papéete Les editions du pacifique, pp. 1–391. 
 Cernohorsky, W.O. 1978. Tropical Pacific Marine Shells. Sydney : Pacific Publications 352 pp., 68 pls.
 Wilson, B. 1994. Australian Marine Shells. Prosobranch Gastropods. Kallaroo, WA : Odyssey Publishing Vol. 2 370 pp.
 Röckel, D., Korn, W. & Kohn, A.J. 1995. Manual of the Living Conidae. Volume 1: Indo-Pacific Region. Wiesbaden : Hemmen 517 pp.
 Filmer R.M. (2001). A Catalogue of Nomenclature and Taxonomy in the Living Conidae 1758 – 1998. Backhuys Publishers, Leiden. 388pp.
 Tucker J.K. (2009). Recent cone species database. September 4, 2009 Edition
 Tucker J.K. & Tenorio M.J. (2009) Systematic classification of Recent and fossil conoidean gastropods. Hackenheim: Conchbooks. 296 pp

Gallery
Below are several color forms and one subspecies:

External links
 Petit, R. E. (2009). George Brettingham Sowerby, I, II & III: their conchological publications and molluscan taxa. Zootaxa. 2189: 1–218
 The Conus Biodiversity website
 
 Cone Shells – Knights of the Sea

eburneus
Gastropods described in 1792